Oligopithecus is a fossil primate that lived in Africa during the Early Oligocene. It is represented by one species, Oligopithecus savagei, known from one jaw bone found in Egypt.

Morphology
Oligopithecus savagei has a dental formula of 2.1.2.3 on the lower jaw. The canine is relatively small and the front premolar is narrow. It also resembles the callitrichines more than the catarrhines. The lower third premolar is sectorial. Oligopithecus savagei has primitive molars as compared to other haplorrhines. The lower molars have a trigonid which is higher than the talonid. The lower molars also have a long and obliquely directed cristid obliqua and a small paraconid on the first molar. The lower molars of this species had sharply defined and high occlusal crests and cusps.

Range
Oligopithecus savagei was found in Africa and discovered in Egypt.

References

External links
 Mikko's Phylogeny archive

Oligocene mammals of Africa
Oligocene primates
†Oligopithecus
Prehistoric primate genera
Fossil taxa described in 1962